Omniscriptum Publishing Group, formerly known as VDM Verlag Dr. Müller, is a German publishing group headquartered in Riga, Latvia. Founded in 2002 in Düsseldorf, its book production is based on print-to-order technology. 

The company publishes theses, research notes, and dissertations through its e-commerce bookstores. Its publishing methods have been questioned for the soliciting of manuscripts from individuals, and for providing authors with the appearance of a peer-reviewed publishing history. OmniScriptum is designated as non-academic by the Norwegian Scientific Index, and its subsidiary Lambert Academic Publishing has been described as a predatory vanity press which does "not apply the basic standards of academic publishing such as peer-review, editorial or proof-reading processes."

The company also offers print-to order publishing for fiction authors. It previously specialized in publishing and selling Wikipedia articles, but has stated that the practice of publishing Wikipedia content ended in 2013.

History
The first publishing house of the group was founded in Düsseldorf in 2002 by Wolfgang Philipp Müller, and transferred to Saarbrücken in August 2005. The Mauritian office was established in April 2007 and was managed from 2008 up until May 2011 by David Benoit Novel, followed by Reezwan Ghanty.

In 2007 the group began distributing its publications through Lightning Source, Amazon, and the German company Books on Demand.

Products and services
Omniscriptum specializes in German, Russian, Spanish, French, and English dissertations, theses, and research projects. Its business model involves a team of acquisitions editors, who search the Internet for academic authors and invite them by unsolicited e-mail for their manuscripts. The editorial team sends emails to people who have written a master's thesis or doctoral dissertation and whose college library has a web-accessible catalog.

In April 2010 Omniscriptum founded an imprint devoted to religion, spirituality, and Christian theology: Fromm Verlag. In October 2010 Dictus Publishing was launched to publish political texts related to the European Union.

Controversies

Wikipedia content duplication
Various branches of the company, including Alphascript Publishing (created in April 2009), Betascript Publishing (created in January 2010), Fastbook Publishing (created in July 2009), and Doyen Verlag, have published books consisting of compilations of Wikipedia articles. These books are widespread and have been purchased or acquired by various libraries and academic institutions in at least Europe and Asia; many copies can be found at the National Taiwan University.

The titles were published as edited by Frederic P. Miller, Agnes F. Vandome, and John McBrewster who are also listed as authors.  180,818 titles were listed on the OMS bookshop. Betascript lists , Miriam T. Timpledon, Susan F. Marseken, Mariam T. Tennoe, and Susan F. Henssonow as editors, giving an additional 356,765 titles .

Regarding its publishing strategies, Alphascript asserted that: "There is hardly another platform for quick and better processing of information than Wikipedia" for customers "who want to be informed on a specific subject" in book form, though they can "have online everything free of charge".

Omniscriptum has edited 22,000 works.

According to the company, the last compilation of Wikipedia articles was published in 2013. The company has stated that it stopped the practice of publishing Wikipedia content in order to focus on "original academic (and) special interest authors."

Business practices
Omniscriptum's business practices have been questioned for profiting by the sale of unacclaimed works and for insufficiently disclosing that content is available elsewhere. In November 2009 an article in the Swiss newspaper Berner Zeitung described Omniscriptum's practices as questionable. The paper faulted Omniscriptum for not disclosing that the books it was publishing were academic dissertations, for publishing works that received a passing grade, and for charging high prices. American writer Victoria Strauss characterized OMS as "an academic author mill", while Pagan Kennedy notes that OMS's practices are comparable to a form of kudzu weed proliferation in book publishing.

In January 2011 German professor Debora Weber-Wulff, in Copy, Shake, and Paste (a blog about plagiarism and scientific misconduct), referred to OMS as a spam publisher, which has been further confirmed in a blog post at Guide2Research.

Multiplication of imprint names

Omniscriptum Group subsidiaries
Omniscriptum Publishing Group has 27 subsidiaries (the date of creation and headquarters are in brackets):

Publishing houses
 VDM Verlag Dr. Müller GmbH & Co. KG (2002, Saarbrücken, Germany)
 AV Akademikerverlag GmbH & Co. KG (2011, Saarbrücken, Germany)
 Scholars' Press Publishing is a trademark of: AV Akademikerverlag GmbH&  Co. KG Heinrich-Böcking-Str. 6-8, 66121, Saarbrücken
 LAP Lambert Academic Publishing GmbH & Co. KG (Saarbrücken, Germany)
 Südwestdeutscher Verlag für Hochschulschriften GmbH & Co. KG (Saarbrücken, Germany)
 EUE Editions Universitaires Européennes (2010, Saarbrücken, Germany)
 Verlag Classic Edition (2009, Saarbrücken, Germany)
 Saarbrücker Verlag für Rechtswissenschaften (2009, Saarbrücken, Germany)
 Lehrbuchverlag (2011, Saarbrücken, Germany)
 EAE Editorial Académica Española (2011, Saarbrücken, Germany)
 PUA Publicaciones Universitarias Argentinas (2011, Saarbrücken, Germany)
 Fromm Verlag (2010, Saarbrücken, Germany)
 Dictus Publishing (2010, Saarbrücken, Germany)
 BB Bloggingsbooks (2011, Saarbrücken, Germany)
 Trainerverlag (2011, Saarbrücken, Germany)
 JustFiction! Edition (2011, Saarbrücken, Germany)
 Doyen Verlag (2010, Saarbrücken, Germany)
 Palmarium Academic Publishing (2013, Saarbrücken, Germany)
 GlobeEdit (Saarbrücken, Germany)
 FastBook Publishing (2009, Beau-Bassin, Mauritius)
 Alphascript Publishing (2009, Beau-Bassin, Mauritius)
 Betascript Publishing (2010, Beau-Bassin, Mauritius)

Service industries
 VDM Publishing House Ltd renamed International Book Market Service Ltd (2008, Beau-Bassin, Mauritius) in 2011
 VDM Verlagsservicegesellschaft mbH (2008, Saarbrücken, Germany)
 VDM IT-Dienstleistungen GmbH & Co. KG (2008, Saarbrücken, Germany)
 MoreBooks! Publishing GmbH (2009, Chişinău, Moldova)
 Morebooks! The online bookshop (2010, Saarbrücken, Germany)
 BetterBooks! Publishing GmbH (2011, Saarbrücken, Germany)
 NicerBooks! Publishing GmbH (2011, Saarbrücken, Germany)
 VDM Verwaltung Aktiengesellschaft (Saarbrücken, Germany)

See also

 Alphascript Publishing book by Miller FP, Vandome AF, McBrewster J: a scanned example
 Books LLC
 Ingram Content Group
 Philip M. Parker
 Print on demand

References

External links
Omniscriptum

Book publishing companies of Germany
Book publishing companies of Latvia
Book selling websites
Wikipedia-derived encyclopedias
Publishing companies established in 2002
Mass media in Saarbrücken
Self-publishing companies
2002 establishments in Germany